The Soccer Game is a football management game released by Wizard Games of Scotland in 1989.  The player manages a football team in the English league. The team starts in the 4th division, although any team from [what were then] the top 4 division of England can be chosen.  The player can alter a team's name before playing. The squad usually consisted of 11 players, but new players could be purchased. According to the help file, the database had 1270 players, and 100 each of treasurers, scouts, physiotherapists, managers and assistant managers.  The action in the football matches was written out on the screen.

The game had many humorous elements that were dropped from Wizard's later football games.  There was a "Comments" option on the physio, and this produced irrelevant statements such as "I want more money" and "If you can't stand losing then don't play this game."  When the scout had found a player, his report would read, "I almost had a deal with...."  The finance section allowed the player to trade shares in the club, take out loans (always at 20% interest) and gamble on the team's results.

Wizard Games continued to produce football-management games with the later releases 1-0 Soccer Manager and Goal 94.

External links

1989 video games
DOS games
DOS-only games
Association football management video games
Video games developed in the United Kingdom